Ölürüm Sana (I'd Die For You) is Tarkan's third studio album, released on July 5, 1997. The album was distributed in both Europe and Asia. It sold more than 3 million copies in Turkey, and a total of 4.5 million worldwide, and sales continued till 2003. This album received very good reviews, becoming one of Turkey's best-selling albums, and played a heavy role in catapulting Tarkan to the status of 'Mega-Star'.

Track listing

Music videos
 "Şımarık" (Published: 10 July 1997)
 "İkimizin Yerine" (Published: 6 October 1997)
 "Salına Salına Sinsice" (Published: 9 March 1998)
 "Ölürüm Sana" (Published: 12 July 1998)

Singles
"Şımarık", "Ölürüm Sana", "Salına Salına Sinsice", and "Kır Zincirlerini" enjoyed a relatively high success in Turkey and the world.

Launched in 1998 as a single, "Şımarık" helped Tarkan to become known Europe and around the world, and, released in 1999, his song "Kır Zincirlerini (Bu Gece)" also increased his fan-base.

The third track on the album "Salına Salına Sinsice" was remixed for its music video, and this remixed version was not available in the album itself.

Personnel
Tarkan: Vocals
Erden Sökmen, David Matos, Can Şengün: Guitars
Ozan Çolakoğlu: Keyboards, Piano
James Cruz, İsmail Soyberk, Murat Ejder: Bass
Hamdi Akatay: Drums
Shawn Pelton: Kick Drum
Seyfi Ayta: Bendir, Bongos, Castanets, Daf, Hollow and Goblet Drums
Cengiz Ercümer, Aydın Karabulut: Percussion
İlyas Tetik, Hüseyin Bitmez: Oud
Ahmet Kadri Rizeli: Kemenche
Ertuğrul Köseoğlu: French Horn
Bülent Altınbaş: Clarinet

Production
Produced by Ozan Çolakoğlu
Executive-produced by Mehmet Söğütoğlu; supervised by Tarkan
Production assisted by Egemen Öncel, Uygar Ataş and Özgür Buldum
Recording Engineers: Özgür Buldum, Arzu Alsan, Denise Barbarita, Murat Matthew Erdem, Serkan Kula, Shawn Coffey, Steve Sauder, Ufuk Çoban
Mixed by Brian Kinkead, Ozan Çolakoğlu and Rıza Erekli
Editing by Duyal Karagözoğlu, Serhan Keser and Çağlar Türkmen
Mastered by Çağlar Türkmen

References

External links
 Tarkan Translations
 Ozgur Buldum

Tarkan (singer) albums
1997 albums